Nicolet-Yamaska  is a regional county municipality in the Centre-du-Québec region of Quebec, Canada.

The county seat is Nicolet.

Subdivisions
There are 16 subdivisions within the RCM:

Cities & Towns (1)
 Nicolet

Municipalities (11)
 Aston-Jonction
 Baie-du-Febvre
 Grand-Saint-Esprit
 La Visitation-de-Yamaska
 Pierreville
 Saint-Célestin
 Saint-François-du-Lac
 Saint-Léonard-d'Aston
 Saint-Wenceslas
 Sainte-Eulalie
 Sainte-Monique

Parishes (3)
 Saint-Elphège
 Sainte-Perpétue
 Saint-Zéphirin-de-Courval

Villages (1)
 Saint-Célestin

First Nations Reserve (1)

 Odanak

Demographics
Mother tongue from 2016 Canadian Census

Transportation

Access Routes
Highways and numbered routes that run through the municipality, including external routes that start or finish at the county border:

 Autoroutes
 
 

 Principal Highways
 
 
 
 

 Secondary Highways
 
 
 

 External Routes
 None

See also
 List of regional county municipalities and equivalent territories in Quebec

References

External links
 Nicolet-Yamaska RCM official web portal